Mihamleh-ye Sofla (also Romanized as Mīhamleh-ye Soflá; also known as Mīhamleh-ye Pā'īn) is a village in Deymkaran Rural District, Salehabad District, Bahar County, Hamadan Province, Iran. At the 2006 census, its population was 412, in 89 families.

References 

Populated places in Bahar County